Caseolus leptostictus is a species of small air-breathing land snails, terrestrial pulmonate gastropod mollusks in the family Geomitridae. This species is endemic to the Madeira island, Portugal.

References

leptostictus
Molluscs of Europe
Endemic fauna of Madeira
Taxa named by Richard Thomas Lowe
Gastropods described in 1852
Taxonomy articles created by Polbot